"What About Love" is a song by American singer Austin Mahone from his second  EP, The Secret (2014). 
The song was released as the lead single from the EP on June 10, 2013.
The song was written by Mahone, Nadir Khayat, Mohombi, Achraf Janussi, Bilal Hajji, Jimmy "Jimmy Joker" Thörnfeldt, and Gary "Rivington Starchild" Angulo and produced by RedOne and Jimmy Joker. The song was released in the United States as a digital download on June 10, 2013. "What About Love" peaked at number 66 on the Billboard Hot 100 and was certified Gold by the Recording Industry Association of America (RIAA), denoting sales of over 500,000 copies in the United States. It received similar chart prominence in Canada, reaching number 67 on the Canadian Hot 100. The song's accompanying music video was directed by Colin Tilley.

Commercial performance
"What About Love" debuted on the Billboard Hot 100 at number 74 the week of June 29, 2013. Five weeks later, it peaked at number 66 and stayed on the chart for nine weeks. By January 2014, the song sold 374,000 digital downloads according to Nielsen Soundscan. On August 4, 2014, the song was certified gold by the Recording Industry Association of America (RIAA), denoting sales of over 500,000 units in that country. In Canada, the track debuted and peaked at number 67 on the Canadian Hot 100 the week it debuted on the Billboard Hot 100, and remained on the chart for five weeks.

Music video
The music video was directed by Colin Tilley. Visual effects were created by GloriaFX. This music video was Mahone's first to be certified in the digital platform Vevo on January 1, 2015, which means that it was his first clip to receive over 100 million views on that platform. It was filmed in Hollywood Beach, Florida. Some scenes were taken in a known motel named "Diane". The video gave Mahone the Artist to Watch Award at the 2013 MTV Video Music Awards.

Track listing
Digital download
 "What About Love" – 3:23

Credits and personnel
Personnel
 Austin Mahone – lead vocals, songwriter
 Nadir Khayat – producer, songwriter, background vocals, additional programming, vocal arrangement
 Jimmy "Jimmy Joker" Thörnfeldt – producer, songwriter, background vocals, additional programming
 Mohombi – songwriter, background vocals
 Ameerah Roelants – background vocals
 Bilal Hajji – songwriter
 Gary "Rivington Starchild" Angulo – songwriter
 Achraf Janussi – songwriter, mixing engineer, vocal arrangement
 Jordan Sapp – mixing engineer, vocal arrangement
 Trevor Muzzy – mixing

Recording
 Recorded at The Hit Factory, Miami, Florida

Charts

Weekly charts

Certifications

Release history

References

External links
 

2013 singles
2013 songs
Austin Mahone songs
Music videos directed by Colin Tilley
Republic Records singles
Song recordings produced by RedOne
Songs written by RedOne
Songs written by AJ Junior
Songs written by Bilal Hajji
Songs written by Mohombi
Songs written by Austin Mahone
Songs written by Jimmy Thörnfeldt